Edward Solomon (1855–1895) was an English composer, conductor, and pianist.

Edward Solomon may also refer to:
Edward Philip Solomon (1845–1914), British lawyer and politician in colonial South Africa
Edward I. Solomon (born 1946), American chemist
Ed Solomon (born 1960), American screenwriter and filmmaker

See also
Ed Salamon, American radio producer and executive.
Edward Salomon (1828–1909), German-American politician; 8th Governor of Wisconsin
Edward S. Salomon (1836–1913), German-American Civil War officer and 9th Governor of Washington Territory